Hi Viz (typeset as HI VIZ) is the fourth studio album by Australian electronic duo The Presets. The album was released in Australia by Modular Recordings on 1 June 2018.

Upon release, the band said "We're always trying to do something different, at least within what we feel is The Presets. We were really just trying to get back to fun. The whole message of the record is inclusiveness, and it's a party, with an open invitation."

In April 2018, The Presets announced a national tour commencing in June 2018.

At the ARIA Music Awards of 2018, the album was nominated for ARIA Award for Best Cover Art.

Critical reception

Sosefina Fuamoli from The AU Review gave the album 4 out of 5, writing: "If you've been a long time fan of The Presets, Hi Viz won't be treading unfamiliar territory, though it's exciting to comprehend what this album will mean for new fans, or those music listeners who may have just been casual listeners before." Fuamoli also called the album "a defining point for The Presets; they've made their return in a climate flushed with young producers climbing their way to the top but make no mistake, they've dropped a great "How To Do It Right" record with this". MJ O'Neill from The Music Au gave the album 4.5 out of 5 saying, "The tripping half-step beats, jazz scales and random bursts of 8-bit noise on opener "Knuckles" are probably the weirdest thing The Presets have ever done." adding "Hi Viz drops all pretences and simply detonates the dancefloor. It's bloody brilliant. Creative? Expressive? Surprisingly contemporary, even? Yep. All those things. But, above all, it's just awesome."

Andrew Drever from The Sydney Morning Herald opined that "The Presets have never made an album like Hi Viz – full throttle from go to whoa. It's their best, and strangest album. Many of the tracks seem constructed like club music, with Hamilton's voice (often processed, like a phone call down a bad line) left to find its place or dutifully serve the sleek, electronic set pieces as another instrument." Triple J called the album "a colourful blend of "rave nuggets, cyber croons and pub techno" for what they're referring to as their 'party album'." Cyclone Wehner from Music Feeds said: "Hi Viz is contemporary party music that pays homage to the past, and anticipates a brighter future, while shedding the pretension." aaa Backstage said: "Hi Viz is The Presets' incongruous, opus piece. Throughout the album, the duo's club textures stretch and spasm to strange dynamics. Artificial and dispersed in ungainly bursts, it is garish and gorgeous all at once." Stack magazine stated: "Hi Viz is the soundtrack to a crazy night out, where you wake up the following day, discombobulated, wondering, "What have I done? Where have I been?" All you know for sure is you had fun."

Track listing

Charts

Release history

References

2018 albums
The Presets albums
EMI Records albums
Modular Recordings albums